Lectionary 1682, designated by symbol ℓ 1682 in the Gregory-Aland numbering, is a Greek manuscript of the New Testament, on paper leaves, dated paleographically to the 16th century.

Description  

It is written in Greek cursive letters, on 131 leaves (27 by 14.5 cm), 1 column per page, 24 lines per page. 
The codex contains some Lessons from the four Gospels lectionary (Evangelistarium) with some lacunae. 

The codex now is located in the Bible Museum Münster (MS. 14).

See also  

 List of New Testament lectionaries 
 Textual criticism 
 Bible Museum Münster

References

Further reading  

 S. P. Lambros, Νέος Ἑλληνομνήμων 12 (1915), p. 232-233.

External links  

 Lectionary 1682 at the CSNTM 
 Manuscripts of the Bible Museum 

Greek New Testament lectionaries
16th-century biblical manuscripts